Nenad Srećković (Serbian Cyrillic: Ненад Срећковић; born 11 April 1988) is a Serbian professional footballer who plays as a left winger for Greek Football League club Aspropyrgos.

Honours

Player

Club
Koper
Slovenian Cup: 2014–15

Radnik Bijeljina
Bosnian Cup: 2015–16
Republika Srpska Cup: 2015–16, 2016–17, 2017–18, 2018–19

References

External links
 

1988 births
Living people
People from Gornji Milanovac
Serbian footballers
Association football midfielders
Serbian expatriate footballers
Red Star Belgrade footballers
FK Rad players
FK Napredak Kruševac players
FK Srem players
FK Mladi Radnik players
FK Kolubara players
De Graafschap players
Fredrikstad FK players
FC Koper players
FK Radnik Bijeljina players
NK Krško players
Serbian SuperLiga players
Serbian First League players
Eredivisie players
Eliteserien players
Slovenian PrvaLiga players
Premier League of Bosnia and Herzegovina players
Expatriate footballers in the Netherlands
Expatriate footballers in Slovenia
Serbian expatriate sportspeople in Slovenia
Expatriate footballers in Norway
Serbian expatriate sportspeople in Norway
Enosi Panaspropyrgiakou Doxas players